Danskammer Point Light was a lighthouse on Danskammer Point in the Town of Newburgh in New York, along the banks of the Hudson River. It was later demolished and is now the site of the Danskammer Generating Station.

Notes

References
"Light Station Struck by Lightning. Report of James H. Wiest, Keeper of Danskammer Point Light Station, N. Y." Lighthouse Service Bulletin I, 34 (Oct 1934), p. 134.
Warren Mumford article about Danskammer Light

External links
 Lighthouse Friends site
 
 
 Lighthouse Depot info
 Devil's Dance Chamber

Lighthouses completed in 1885
Lighthouses completed in 1915
Lighthouses in New York (state)
Transportation buildings and structures in Orange County, New York
Hudson River
Newburgh, New York

Buildings and structures in Newburgh, New York